Sir Michael Francis Joseph McDonnell (1882–1956) was Chief Justice of Palestine between 1927 and 1936.  He had previously been a colonial civil servant and Acting Chief Justice of Sierra Leone.

Education and career 
Born in London to an Irish Catholic family, McDonnell attended the public St Paul's School, London (he later wrote a history of the school and its illustrious alumni). He went on to read medicine and then law at St John's College, Cambridge, where he also served as president of the Cambridge Union Society. At the Union, Michael and his older brother T.F.R. McDonnell championed the Irish Home Rule cause. Both were also adamant supporters of women's suffrage and admission to Cambridge.

After graduating from Cambridge McDonnell was called to the Bar at the Inner Temple. At that time he authored the book Ireland and the Home Rule Movement (1908), an attack on British policy in Ireland and a critique of Empire more broadly. McDonnell nevertheless went on to join the Colonial Service in 1911, serving in British West Africa for sixteen years. During his time in West Africa McDonnell served as Assistant District Commissioner in the Gold Coast, magistrate in The Gambia, and Attorney-General and Acting Chief Justice in Sierra Leone.

Retirement 
McDonnell was forced into early retirement – historian Matthew Hughes speaks of his being dismissed from office, in October 1936.  This was towards the end of the first wave of the Arab Revolt, and he was replaced by Harry Herbert Trusted in January 1937. McDonnell's retirement was induced by a series of clashes with Palestine's High Commissioner, Sir Arthur Wauchope, over the role of Palestine's judiciary in suppressing the "disturbances". This clash culminated in McDonnell's ruling in the El Qasir v Attorney-General (1936) 3 PLR 121 case. The decision pertained to house demolitions scheduled to take place in the old city of Jaffa. Although McDonnell ruled that the government had the authority to demolish the houses, he deemed the government's reliance on town planning justifications, rather than military necessity, an act of moral cowardice and accused it of "throwing dust" in the public's eyes.

After retiring from the bench and returning to London, McDonnell took up advocacy on behalf of the Arab cause in Palestine: he published a number of articles in which he attacked Britain's pro-Zionist policy in Palestine and in 1939, he was an adviser to the Arab delegation concerning the 1915–1916 correspondence between Sir Henry McMahon and the Sharif Hussayn of Mecca.

References

External links 
 
 

1882 births
1956 deaths
Presidents of the Cambridge Union
Alumni of St John's College, Cambridge
Gold Coast (British colony) people
Gambia Colony and Protectorate judges
Sierra Leone Colony and Protectorate judges
Attorneys-General of the Sierra Leone Colony and Protectorate
Chief justices of Sierra Leone
Mandatory Palestine judges
Chief justices
People of the 1936–1939 Arab revolt in Palestine